Phoenicoprocta is a genus of tiger moths in the family Erebidae. The genus was erected by Herbert Druce in 1898.

Species
Phoenicoprocta analis Schrottky, 1909
Phoenicoprocta astrifera (Butler, 1877)
Phoenicoprocta capistrata (Fabricius, 1775)
Phoenicoprocta haemorrhoidalis (Fabricius, 1775)
Phoenicoprocta hampsonii (Barnes, 1904) (formerly Syntomeida hampsonii)
Phoenicoprocta jamaicensis (Schaus, 1901)
Phoenicoprocta lydia (H. Druce, 1889) – Lydia tiger moth
Phoenicoprocta mexicana (Walker, [1865])
Phoenicoprocta partheni (Fabricius, 1793)
Phoenicoprocta paucipuncta Dyar, 1914
Phoenicoprocta rubiventer Hampson, 1898
Phoenicoprocta sanguinea (Walker, 1854)
Phoenicoprocta teda (Walker, 1854)
Phoenicoprocta thera (H. Druce, 1889)
Phoenicoprocta vacillans (Walker, 1856)

References

Euchromiina
Moth genera